The 2011 CONCACAF Gold Cup was the 11th edition of the CONCACAF Gold Cup competition, and the 21st CONCACAF regional championship overall in CONCACAF's 50 years of existence. The United States was the host nation.

The competition started on June 5, 2011, at Cowboys Stadium in Arlington, and ended with the final on June 25, 2011, at the Rose Bowl in Pasadena, California, with Mexico beating the United States 4–2.

This competition was the fifth tournament without guests from other confederations. Mexico won their sixth Gold Cup, and ninth CONCACAF Championship overall. It was the third consecutive Gold Cup final and second consecutive win also.

As winner of the tournament, Mexico qualified for the 2013 FIFA Confederations Cup in Brazil as the representative from CONCACAF.

Qualified teams
A total of 12 teams qualified for the tournament. Three berths were allocated to North America, five to Central America, and four to the Caribbean.

Venues
The set of thirteen venues – the same number as the 2009 Gold Cup – was announced on December 16, 2010. Each stadium hosted a doubleheader, except the Rose Bowl which hosted the final.

Squads

The 12 national teams involved in the tournament were required to register a squad of 23 players; only players in these squads were eligible to take part in the tournament.

Suspension of Mexican players
On June 9, 2011, the names of five Mexican players were released announcing Christian Bermúdez, Édgar Dueñas, Guillermo Ochoa, Francisco Javier Rodríguez and Sinha, all tested positive for clenbuterol prior to the start of the 2011 Gold Cup. They were withdrawn from the squad a few days after their June 5 Gold Cup starting match and 5-0 win against El Salvador. Mexican officials said they believed the positive tests were caused by eating meat tainted with the drug. CONCACAF General Secretary Chuck Blazer said a meeting of the confederation's national teams committee, which also serves as the organizing committee of the Gold Cup, was to be convened on June 10 to consider the situation, including possibly allowing Mexico to replace the five players. However, the meeting was postponed to allow for more information to be gathered. The Mexican Football Federation said on June 14 that the "B" samples of those five involving players were negative.
The CONCACAF Gold Cup Organizing Committee announced on June 19 that Mexico would be allowed to replace the suspended players. The replacement players were, Luis Ernesto Michel, Héctor Reynoso, Paul Aguilar, Marco Fabián, and Hiram Mier. All players were later acquitted by the Mexican Football Federation and the results were blamed on contamination of meat, with the ingestion of clenbuterol considered non-intentional. However, the World Anti-Doping Agency (WADA) appealed to the Court of Arbitration for Sport to request a ban. On October 12, 2011, WADA withdrew the request after the full file was available for them.

El Salvador match fixing
On September 20, 2013, the Salvadoran Football Federation banned 14 Salvadoran players for life due to their involvement with match fixing while playing with the El Salvador national team over the previous two years, including 8 players (Dennis Alas, Luis Anaya, captain Marvin González, Reynaldo Hernández, Miguel Montes, Dagoberto Portillo, Osael Romero, Ramón Sánchez and Miguel Montes), from El Salvador's 5-0 loss to Mexico on June 5 at the 2011 CONCACAF Gold Cup.

Group stage
All Times are U.S. Eastern Daylight Time (UTC−4) (Local Times in parentheses)

Group A

Group B

Group C

Ranking of third-placed teams

Knockout stage

All times U.S. Eastern Daylight Time (UTC−4) (Local times in parentheses)

Quarterfinals

Semifinals

Final

Statistics

Goalscorers

7 goals
 Javier Hernández
4 goals

 Rodolfo Zelaya
 Aldo de Nigris

3 goals

 Marco Ureña
 Jerry Bengtson
 Carlo Costly
 Demar Phillips
 Pablo Barrera
 Giovani dos Santos
 Andrés Guardado
 Luis Tejada
 Clint Dempsey

2 goals

 Dwayne De Rosario
 Brice Jovial

 Carlos Ruiz
 Ryan Johnson
 Gabriel Gómez
 Jozy Altidore

1 goal

 Randall Brenes
 Joel Campbell
 Dennis Marshall
 Heiner Mora
 Álvaro Saborío
 Yénier Márquez
 Arturo Álvarez
 Léster Blanco
 Eliseo Quintanilla
 Osael Romero
 Clive Murray
 José Javier del Aguila
 Carlos Gallardo
 Marco Pappa
 Walter Martínez
 Alfredo Mejía
 Omar Daley
 Luton Shelton
 Efraín Juárez
 Rafael Márquez
 Blas Pérez
 Michael Bradley
 Landon Donovan
 Clarence Goodson
 Jermaine Jones

1 own goal
 Clarence Goodson (playing against Panama)

Awards

Winners

Individual awards

The Fair Play Award was awarded to Mexico because they accumulated the fewest cards.

Best Saves 

<div style="text-align:left">

Best Goals

Final ranking
Per statistical convention in football, matches decided in extra time are counted as wins and losses, while matches decided by penalty shoot-out are counted as draws.

References

External links

 

 
CONCACAF Gold Cup tournaments
Gold Cup
CONCACAF Gold Cup 2011
Concacaf Gold Cup
June 2011 sports events in the United States